"Let Me Drink" is a song by Australian singer Guy Sebastian featuring The HamilTones and Wale. It was released on 15 November 2019 as the third single from his ninth studio album T.R.U.T.H..

The song was nominated for Most Performed Pop Work at the APRA Music Awards of 2021

Background
Sebastian admits that The HamilTones remind him of growing up and his involvement in church music. Sebastian wrote "Let Me Drink" on the night before The HamilTones were scheduled to join Sebastian in the studio to record some backing vocals for his upcoming album. Sebastian recalls thinking "I'm crazy if I don't write something that's super-catered to them... I reckon it probably took 15 minutes to write. I started singing that 'Come on let me drink' melody, I could immediately hear the background vocals and I just knew it had to be a call-and-response thing. And then I sat down and nutted out a standard blues chord progression. With me, I write really quickly if I’m led by something."

On 3AW radio, Sebastian told Denis Walter the song is "very lighthearted". He told Walter "I needed something a little bit light, and something that wasn't so emotional because 'Choir' is about losing a friend of mine, and 'Before I Go' was quite an emo sort of song as well."

Music video
The music video for "Let Me Drink" was directed by James Chappell and released on 2 December 2019.

Charts

References

2019 singles
Guy Sebastian songs
Sony Music Australia singles
2019 songs
Songs written by Guy Sebastian
Songs written by Wale (rapper)
Songs written by M-Phazes
Wale (rapper) songs